Vicente Padula (July 14, 1898 – January 16, 1967) was an Argentine film actor. Padula moved to the United States, and appeared regularly in Hollywood films. He also made films in Mexico. Padula was a friend of the Argentine film star Carlos Gardel and appeared in several of his American films including Suburban Melody (1933) which was one of the highest-grossing film in their native Argentina that year.

Partial filmography

 Winds of the Pampas (1927) - Emilio
 Charros, gauchos y manolas (1930) - Argentinian artist
 El cuerpo del delito (1930) - Sargento Heath
 La fuerza del querer (1930) - Steve
 Amor audaz (1930) - Silvestre Corbett
 Del mismo barro (1930) - Sr. Fullerton
 El último de los Vargas (1930) - Blanco
 El presidio (1930) - Dunn
 Monsieur Le Fox (1930)
 Gente alegre (1931) - Max
 The Lights of Buenos Aires (1931) - Ciriaco
 La barra de Taponazo (1932)
 Suburban Melody (1933) - Gutiérrez
 Aves sin rumbo (1934) - El Italiano
 Downward Slope (1934) - Jorge Linares
 The Tango on Broadway (1934) - Juan Carlos
 La viuda quería emociones (1935)
 La justicia de Pancho Villa (1939) - Vicente Múgica
 Una luz en mi camino (1939)
 Explosivo 008 (1940)
 Las cinco advertencias de Satanás (1941)
 The Road of the Llamas (1942)
 Cuando quiere un mexicano (1944)
 Gran Hotel (1944) - Conde Zapattini
 Los hijos de Don Venancio (1944) - Fontanals
 El camino de las llamas (1944)
 Bésame mucho (1945) - Tío Guiseppe
 Bartolo toca la flauta (1945) - Renard
 Canaima (1945) - Vellorini el bueno
 Una vírgen moderna (1946)
 The Associate (1946) - Don Fortunato
 La hija del payaso (1946)
 Los nietos de Don Venancio (1946) - Fontanals (uncredited)
 Se acabaron las mujeres (1946) - Che Gómez
 Ella (1946) - Carlos
 Nace la libertad (1949)
 The Avengers (1950) - El Mocho / Hernandez
 Three Coins in the Fountain (1954) - Dr. Martinelli (uncredited)
 The Last Command (1955) - General Cos (uncredited)
 The Girl Rush (1955) - Maitre d' (uncredited)
 Serenade (1956) - Pagnil (uncredited)
 The Three Outlaws (1956) - Mr. Gutzmer
 The Brass Legend (1956) - Sanchez
 The Cyclops (1957) - The Governor
 Hell Canyon Outlaws (1957) - Julio
 The Flame Barrier (1958) - Julio
 Pier 5, Havana (1959) - General (uncredited)
 Raymie (1960) - Veulo

References

Bibliography 
 Finkielman, Jorge. The Film Industry in Argentina: An Illustrated Cultural History. McFarland, 2003.

External links 
 

1898 births
1967 deaths
Argentine male film actors
20th-century Argentine male actors
People from Buenos Aires
Argentine emigrants to the United States